Alice Ishbel Hay Creswick  (21 September 1889, Aberdeen, Scotland – 24 October 1973, Armadale, Victoria, Australia) is best known for her work in the Free Kindergarten Union (FKU) and as an important figure in the Australian Red Cross Society (ARCS) during World War II.

She was president of the committee of the Lady Northcote Free Kindergarten for ten years (1928–1938) and joined the executive of the Free Kindergarten Union (FKU), becoming president in 1939. In 1940, she was 'headhunted' by the Australian Red Cross Society, when they asked her to become its principal commandant. In this capacity, she travelled widely, both inspecting and establishing Red Cross services and activities. 

She resigned from this position in 1946 and immediately resumed her presidency of the FKU, picking up where she left off as an energetic leader who tirelessly lobbied the government for greater support for pre-school training. Ill health forced her to resign in 1949, but she maintained her interest and activism in the area of early childhood development. 

She died in 1973, aged 84, leaving large bequests to the organisations she supported in her lifetime: the FKU, the Australian Red Cross and the Anglican Church.

References

Family
 1910 http://trove.nla.gov.au/newspaper/article/216625691 30 Nov Marriage to HFC
 1911 http://trove.nla.gov.au/newspaper/article/142937770 Jan last week Marriage to HFC
 http://trove.nla.gov.au/newspaper/article/205591552 Daughter Moira Creswick
 1935 http://trove.nla.gov.au/newspaper/article/86549592 Husband killed Henry Forbes, Four children Alec, Sheila, Moira, Archie

Free Kindergarten Union
 1940 http://trove.nla.gov.au/newspaper/article/11302380
 1940 http://trove.nla.gov.au/newspaper/article/204410396 P FKU
 1947 http://trove.nla.gov.au/newspaper/article/206020489 Reelected P FKU
 1949 http://trove.nla.gov.au/newspaper/article/43801723 P FKU, VP ARCS, VP AAPSCD
 1949 http://trove.nla.gov.au/newspaper/article/206078370 Resignation as PFKU
Scholarship sponsor
 1944 http://trove.nla.gov.au/newspaper/article/206794565
 Other references

Red Cross
Personnel member
 1939 http://trove.nla.gov.au/newspaper/article/206330673 Appointment
Co-opted member of CC, member of CCEC
 1939 http://trove.nla.gov.au/newspaper/article/205591552
Chairman of Women's Personnel Committee
 1940 http://trove.nla.gov.au/newspaper/article/46737400
Principal Comandant
 1940 http://trove.nla.gov.au/newspaper/article/40941246 Appointed PC 6 weeks ago
 1940 http://trove.nla.gov.au/newspaper/article/186274902 Recently appointed PC
 1940 http://trove.nla.gov.au/newspaper/article/186274942
 1941 http://trove.nla.gov.au/newspaper/article/47321623
 1942 http://trove.nla.gov.au/newspaper/article/2604327
 1943 http://trove.nla.gov.au/newspaper/article/78460589
 1944 http://trove.nla.gov.au/newspaper/article/127050076
 1944 http://trove.nla.gov.au/newspaper/article/78761363
 1945 http://trove.nla.gov.au/newspaper/article/51761983
 1946 http://trove.nla.gov.au/newspaper/article/22314555
 1946 http://trove.nla.gov.au/newspaper/article/206107991
Junior Vice Chairman
 1946 http://trove.nla.gov.au/newspaper/article/22252615 Resignation of PC and election to VC of NC
 1946 http://trove.nla.gov.au/newspaper/article/188723435 Former PC of Qld Div appointed to VC of NC
 1946 http://trove.nla.gov.au/newspaper/article/96474209
 1947 http://trove.nla.gov.au/newspaper/article/224899727
 1947 http://trove.nla.gov.au/newspaper/article/51761983
 Other references

External links
 Australian Women's Register Biography copy per CC
 Australian Dictionary of Biography

1889 births
1973 deaths
Australian Anglicans
Australian educational theorists
Australian philanthropists
Officers of the Order of the British Empire
People from Aberdeen
People from Victoria (Australia)
Dames of the Order of St John
20th-century philanthropists
19th-century Australian women
20th-century Australian women